Dwindle is 2021 Nigerian comedy film based on the story of Sogo and Buta, two friends who hijack a car and venture into cabbing and how their lives take a drastic turn when their path runs into assassins who have just kidnapped the state governor. It was produced by Mimi Bartels for FilmOne Productions and directed by Kayode Kasum and Dare Olaitan. It stars Funke Akindele, Bisola Aiyeola, Jidekene Achufusi, Gregory Ojefua, Broda Shaggi, Adedimeji Lateef, Timini Egbuson, Efa Iwara and Uzor Arukwe. It was released theatrically on 16 July 2021.

Awards and nominations

References 

Films directed by Kayode Kasum
Nigerian comedy films
English-language Nigerian films
2021 films
2020s English-language films